Lo So Shing Beach is a gazetted beach in Lo So Shing in the west of Lamma Island, Hong Kong. The beach has barbecue pits and is managed by the Leisure and Cultural Services Department of the Hong Kong Government. The beach is 214 metres long and is rated as Grade 1 by the Environmental Protection Department for its water quality. It is located several kilometres away from Hung Shing Yeh Beach and there is no road connection to the beach.

History
The beach was gazetted by the Hong Kong Government and opened in 1972.

In June and August 2015, the beach had to be temporarily closed due to oil pollution at the sea that caused the public not to swim at the beach. The beach had to be temporarily closed in August 2017 also due to oil pollution.

Usage
As the beach is remote from both of the ferry piers on Lamma Island, it is particularly quiet. Since reaching the beach requires some walking, it is often practically deserted even on weekends. The beach is accessible from the Lamma Island Family Walk.

Features
The beach has the following features:
 BBQ pits (6 nos.)
 Changing rooms
 Showers
 Toilets
 Water sports centre
 Light refreshment kiosk

See also
 Beaches of Hong Kong

References

External links 

 Official website

Lamma Island
Beaches of Hong Kong